Roosevelt is the name of some places in the U.S. state of Wisconsin:
Roosevelt, Burnett County, Wisconsin, a town
Roosevelt, Taylor County, Wisconsin, a town
Roosevelt, Oneida County, Wisconsin, an unincorporated community